Drangarnir is the collective name for two sea stacks between the islet Tindhólmur and the island Vágar in the Faroe Islands. The individual names of the sea stacks are Stóri Drangur (en: Large sea stack) and Lítli Drangur (en: Small sea stack).

References

Stacks of the Faroe Islands
Vágar